Archduchess Maria Dorothea of Austria (Maria Dorothea Amelia; ; 14 June 1867 – 6 April 1932) was a member of the Hungarian line of the House of Habsburg and an Archduchess of Austria by birth. Through her marriage to Philippe, Duke of Orléans, Maria Dorothea  was also a member of the House of Orléans. Philippe was the Orléanist claimant to the throne of France from 1894 to 1926 and known to Orléanist monarchists as "Philippe VIII of France." Thus, to Orléanist monarchists, Maria Dorothea was titular Queen of France from 1896 to 1926, and Dowager Queen of France until her death in 1932.

Family

Maria Dorothea was the second-eldest daughter and child of Archduke Joseph Karl of Austria and his wife Princess Clotilde of Saxe-Coburg and Gotha. Through her father Joseph Karl, Maria Dorothea was the great-granddaughter of Leopold II, Holy Roman Emperor. Through her mother, she was the great-granddaughter of Louis Philippe I.

Marriage
Maria Dorothea married Philippe, Duke of Orléans, eldest son of Philippe, Count of Paris and his wife Princess Marie Isabelle of Orléans, on 5 November 1896 in Vienna.

After several years of marriage, the couple's marriage deteriorated and Maria Dorothea began to spend more and more time each year at her family's estate in Alcsút. Nevertheless, in 1906, Philippe attempted to reconnect with his wife and went to Alcsút to convince her to settle with him at the Manoir d'Anjou near Brussels. Maria Dorothea resisted the living arrangement and remained at Alcsút.

Ancestry

References

 Poisson, Georges, Les Orléans, une famille en quête d'un trône, Paris, 1999.

|-

1867 births
1932 deaths
People from Fejér County
Duchesses of Orléans
House of Habsburg-Lorraine
Austrian princesses
Princesses of France (Orléans)
Burials at Palatinal Crypt